The 1997–98 Cypriot Fourth Division was the 13th season of the Cypriot fourth-level football league. SEK won their 1st title.

Format
Fourteen teams participated in the 1997–98 Cypriot Fourth Division. All teams played against each other twice, once at their home and once away. The team with the most points at the end of the season crowned champions. The first three teams were promoted to the 1998–99 Cypriot Third Division and the last three teams were relegated to regional leagues.

Point system
Teams received three points for a win, one point for a draw and zero points for a loss.

Changes from previous season
Teams promoted to 1997–98 Cypriot Third Division
 Adonis Idaliou
 Achilleas Ayiou Theraponta
 Enosis Kokkinotrimithia

Teams relegated from 1996–97 Cypriot Third Division
 Orfeas Nicosia
 AEK Katholiki1
 Tsaggaris Peledriou2

1AEK Katholiki merged with Achilleas Ayiou Theraponta to form AEK/Achilleas Ayiou Theraponta; participated to 1997–98 Cypriot Third Division. 
2Tsaggaris Peledriou withdrew before the start of the 1996–97 Cypriot Third Division; did not participate to 1997–98 Cypriot Fourth Division.

Teams promoted from regional leagues
 ATE PEK Ergaton
 Anagennisi Prosfigon Lemesou
 Evagoras Kato Amiandos
 Anorthosi Polemidion
 Salamina Dromolaxias

Teams relegated to regional leagues
 Digenis Oroklinis
 Digenis Akritas Ypsona
 AEK Kythreas

League standings

Results

See also
 Cypriot Fourth Division
 1997–98 Cypriot First Division
 1997–98 Cypriot Cup

Sources

Cypriot Fourth Division seasons
Cyprus
1997–98 in Cypriot football